The 1948 Western Reserve Red Cats football team represented the Western Reserve University in the American city of Cleveland, Ohio, now known as Case Western Reserve University, during the 1948 college football season.  The Red Cats were a member of the Mid-American Conference (MAC).

The team was coached by Mike Scarry, a former Cleveland Browns player who played under and learned his coaching style from Paul Brown.  Assistant coaches were Dick Luther and Lou Zontini.

On October 23, Western Reserve battledKent State to a 14–14 tie, which was broadcast on television in the Cleveland-Akron area, making it Ohio’s first intercollegiate televised football game.

Western Reserve lost to rival  for the first time since 1927, ending a 17-game Red Cats win streak.

Schedule

References

Western Reserve
Case Western Reserve Spartans football seasons
Western Reserve Red Cats football